Lady for a Night is a 1942 American drama film starring Joan Blondell and John Wayne.  The World War II B-17 bomber the Memphis Belle is named after a steamboat in this film. It is also known as The Lady from New Orleans, Memphis Belle and Lady of New Orleans.

The social climber female owner of a casino steamboat gains the ownership of plantation, and negotiates her marriage to the previous owner in order to gain entry in the upper class. Her new in-laws resent her, and she survives a poisoning attempt. When her husband is murdered instead, the widow is framed for his murder.

Plot
Social climber Jenny Blake owns the casino steamboat Memphis Belle, together with the influential Jack Morgan. Most of the customers are from the upper class, but they have little respect for Jenny and her - in their opinion - vulgar occupation. Jack is secretly in love with Jenny. To show her what it really is she aspires to, he arranges for her to be made queen of the Mardi Gras festivities. This angers the upper crust of society, and she is mocked in public. However, she does not give up.

She decides to use one of the old plantation owners, Alan Alderson, to fulfill her dream. Alan is burdened with debt and manages to lose his plantation, "The Shadows", gambling at the casino. Jenny offers to forgive his debts if he marries her. Alan agrees, and Jenny secures a respectable position in society.

Jack is devastated by Jenny's marriage, and does not try to save the Memphis Belle when it catches fire. Everyone in Alan's family has a hard time accepting Jenny, except his aunt Katherine, who is suffering from mental illness.

Jack goes on to sabotage the relationship between Jenny and Alan. He is helped by Alan's aunt Julia. Julia starts off with insinuations that Jenny has an improper relation with Jack and goes on to try to ruin a ball Jenny is hosting. Jack saves Jenny and the ball by using his political influence to make the guests attend, even though Julia has tried to keep them away. Jenny is almost killed when Julia goes on to let her ride in a carriage pulled by a blind horse.

Jenny retaliates by ordering Julia to leave the plantation. The infuriated Julia then mixes a poisoned drink meant for Jenny, but Alan beats her to it and dies from drinking it. Jenny is accused of murdering her husband and put on trial. Aunt Katherine is the only person who knows that Julia mixed the drink, but she is forced by her sister to testify against Jenny in court.

Jenny is convicted of murder, but Katherine soon confesses that it was Julia who mixed the drink, and a few years earlier also killed Katherine's fiancé in a fit of jealousy. Jenny is cleared of all charges. She meets Jack and they start working together again. She finally gives up her dream to climb the social ladder and accepts Jack's proposal to marry him.

Cast
 Joan Blondell as Jenny "Jen" Blake Alderson
 John Wayne as Jackson Morgan
 Ray Middleton as Alan Alderson
 Philip Merivale as Stephen Alderson
 Blanche Yurka as Julia Anderson
 Edith Barrett as Katherine Alderson
 Leonid Kinskey as Boris, Jack's Bodyguard
 Hattie Noel as Chloe, Jenny's Maid
 Montagu Love as Judge
 Carmel Myers as Mrs. Dickson, the Mayor's Wife
 Dorothy Burgess as Flo
 Guy Usher as Governor
 Ivan Miller as Mayor Dickson
 Patricia Knox as Mabel
 Lew Payton as Napoleon, Alderson's Servant

See also
 John Wayne filmography

References

External links

1942 films
1942 romantic drama films
1940s historical drama films
1940s historical romance films
American romantic drama films
American black-and-white films
American historical drama films
American historical romance films
Films directed by Leigh Jason
Films scored by David Buttolph
Films set in the 1870s
Films set in Memphis, Tennessee
Films about gambling
Republic Pictures films
1940s English-language films
Films with screenplays by Garrett Fort
Films set on boats
Films set on farms
Films about marriage
Films about murder
Poisoning in film
1940s American films